

Ideal Toys
Manglors was a line of action figures originally released by the Ideal Toy Company in 1984-85 and re-licensed by Toyfinity in 2013.  The first wave consisted of Manglord (which was initially released with a playset Manglor Mountain), Manglosaurus and Manglodactyl.  A second wave, packaged with plastic eggs, appeared in 1985, which included Manglodemon, Manglizard, and Manglodragon.  The line consisted of flexible, unjointed (one piece), sticky, and mostly unpainted (some versions of Manglord had purple highlights) Sorbothane figures that were not able to stand on their own.

The original 1980s line was very controversial for its advertising that promoted that not only could the figures be stretched and squashed, but could be torn apart and "return almost like new to their original yucky selves."  Consumers Union's children's publication, Penny Power, took on this claim and found that they could not get the product to live up to its advertising claims, leaving a Manglodemon in many pieces that they were unable to reassemble.  The packaging of the toys encouraged children to mix and match the parts of the various Manglors, but it was not possible to get them to hold together as demonstrated. These figures also have been very hard to find in good condition.

Toyfinity
In June 2015, Onell Design released a "Manglors Mutation" wave under the Glyos System Series with permission from Toyfinity. It included a Neo Granthan figure, four different Skeleden figures, three unique Crayboth mini figures, and one large Super Crayboth figure. An additional fifth Skeleden figure was released exclusively through Toyfinity's Club Zeton 2015. Color tributes included the Mangalord, Manglodemon, Manglodragon, and Manglizard. Toyfinity launched a brand new Manglors line in January 2023 starting with a Manglor Core Humanoid body offering a chance to own Manglord for the first time in forty years while still using the Glyos System Series to offer compatibility across numerous sister lines to create weird mutations similar to the original line with improvements. Due to the sellout within hours of release a five day pre-order window was offered for a Manglord re-issue and Protolord based on the Manglors Mountain version of Manglord.

Toyfinity figures
 Manglord
 Standard Edition - Dark Green with purple paint applications. Released on January 29, 2023. Re-issue pre-order offered from February 6-10, 2023.
 Protolord - Light Blue-Green with Dark Green paint applications. Pre-order offered from February 6-10, 2023.
 Manglosaurus
 Manglosaurian Warrior DX - Tomato Red with plum paint applications. Released on January 29, 2023.
 Manglor Core Humanoid
 Primitive Manglor - Light Purple with dark purple paint applications. Released on January 29, 2023.

References

External links
 Toyfinity.com - Official Manglors Toy Producer
 A look at the rare Manglor Mountain playset at I-Mockery

1980s toys
2010s toys
Ideal Toy Company